This is list of educational centers in Rio de Janeiro.

Public colleges and universities 
Centro Federal de Educação Tecnológico Celso Suckow da Fonseca (CEFET) - Celso Suckow da Fonseca Federal Center for Technological Education
Escola Nacional de Ciências Estatísticas (ENCE) - National School of Statistics Sciences
Rio de Janeiro State University (UERJ) – (Universidade do Estado do Rio de Janeiro)
Universidade Estadual do Norte Fluminense (UENF) – State University of Norte Fluminense [Located in the nearby city of Campos]
Federal University of Rio de Janeiro (UFRJ) – (Universidade Federal do Rio de Janeiro)
Universidade Federal Rural do Rio de Janeiro (UFRRJ) – Rural Federal University of Rio de Janeiro [Located in the nearby city of Seropédica]
Universidade Federal Fluminense (UFF) – "Fluminense" Federal University [Fluminense, in Portuguese, is someone who is born in the state of Rio de Janeiro. This university is located in the nearby city of Niterói]
Universidade Federal do Estado do Rio de Janeiro (UNIRIO) – Federal University of the State of Rio de Janeiro
 Instituto Militar de Engenharia (IME) – Military Institute of Engineering
 Instituto Superior de Tecnologia em Ciências da Computação do Rio de Janeiro (IST-Rio) – Superior Institute of Technology in Computer Science of Rio de Janeiro
Instituto Superior de Educação do Rio de Janeiro (ISERJ) - Superior Institute for Education of Rio de Janeiro

Research centers and graduate schools 
Centro Brasileiro de Pesquisas Físicas (CBPF) – Brazilian Center for Physics Research
Centro de Pesquisas e Desenvolvimento Leopoldo Américo Miguez de Mello (CENPES) - Leopoldo Américo Miguez de Mello Research and Development Center
Escola de Comando e Estado Maior do Exército (ECEME) - Army School of Command and Estado Maior [Estado Maior is a sector of the Brazilian army]
Instituto Alberto Luiz Coimbra de Pós-Graduação e Pesquisa em Engenharia (COPPE) – Alberto Luiz Coimbra Institute for Graduate Studies and Research in Engineering
Insituto de Energia Nuclear (IEN) - Nuclear Energy Institute
Instituto Nacional de Matemática Pura e Aplicada (IMPA) – National institute of Pure and Applied Mathematics
Fundação Oswaldo Cruz (FIOCRUZ) – Oswaldo Cruz Foundation
Instituto Radioproteção e Dosimetria (IRD) – Radiation Protection and Dosimetry Institute
Laboratório Nacional de Computação Científica (LNCC) – National Laboratory for Scientific Computing [Located in the nearby city of Petrópolis]
Observatório Nacional (ON) – National Observatory

Private colleges and universities 
Centro de Ensino Superior de Valença (CESVA) [Located in the nearby city of Valença]
Centro Universitário Augusto Motta (UNISUAM)
Faculdade Angel Vianna
Faculdade Anglo Americano
Faculdade Arthur Sá Earp Neto (FASE) [Located in the nearby city of Petrópolis]
Faculdade Carioca
Faculdade Centro de Cultura Anglo-Americana (CCAA)
Faculdade de Ciências Agro-Ambientais (FCAA)
Faculdade de Medicina de Campos (FMC) [Located in the nearby city of Campos]
Faculdade de Medicina de Petrópolis (FMP) [Located in the nearby city of Petrópolis]
Faculdade de Odontologia de Nova Friburgo (FONF) [Located in the nearby city of Nova Friburgo]
Faculdade de Odontologia de Campos (FOC) [Located in the nearby city of Campos]
Faculdade de São Bento do Rio de Janeiro
Faculdades Integradas Hélio Alonso (FACHA)
Faculdades Integradas Bennett
Faculdades Souza Marques
Fundação Getúlio Vargas (FGV) – Getúlio Vargas Foundation
Instituto Brasileiro de Medicina de Reabilitação (IBMR)
Instituto Brasileiro de Mercado de Capitais (IBMEC) – Brazilian Institute of Capital Markets
Pontifícia Universidade Católica do Rio de Janeiro (PUC-Rio) – Pontifical Catholic University of Rio de Janeiro
Universidade Cândido Mendes (UCAM)
Universidade Católica de Petrópolis (UCP) [Located in the nearby city of Petrópolis]
Universidade Estácio de Sá
Universidade Iguaçu (UNIG) [Located in the nearby city of Nova Iguaçu]
Universidade Gama Filho (UGF)
Universidade do Grande Rio (UNIGRANRIO) 
Universidade Santa Úrsula (USU)
Universidade Univercidade
Universidade Veiga de Almeida (UVA)

Public and private schools 
Rio International School 
British School
CEAT- Centro Educacional Anísio Teixeira
Centro Federal de Educação Tecnológica Celso Suckow da Fonseca (CEFET) - Federal Center of Technology Education Celso Suckow da Fonseca
Centro Federal de Educação Tecnológica de Campos (CEFET) - Federal Center of Technology Education at Campos[Located in the nearby city of Campos]
Centro de Educação e Cultura da Barra  (CEC)
CEFETEQ de Nilópolis - Nilópolis Federal Tecnological Center of Chemistry
CETIQT - Centro de Tecnologia da Indústria Química e Têxtil
CEL- Centro Educacional da Lagoa
Centro Educacional Vieirence
Colégio Andrews
Colégio Cruzeiro (Deutsche Schule)
Colégio de Aplicação da UERJ
Colégio de Aplicação da UFRJ
Colégio Estadual Brigadeiro Schorcht
Colégio Santa Marcelina
Colégio Maria Raythe
Colégio Marista São José
Colégio Nossa Senhora de Lourdes
Colégio Pedro II
Colégio Militar do Rio de Janeiro
Charles Péguy
Colégio Princesa Isabel
Colégio dos Santos Anjos
Colégio Subtente Duplar Pires de Mello (CSDPM)
Colégio da Imaculada Conceição
Escola Alemã Corcovado
 Escola Americana do Rio de Janeiro (EARJ) (American School)
Escola Parque
EDEM
FAETEC - Support Foundation of the Technical Schools
Instituto Analice
Instituto de Educação Sarah Kubitschek
Instituto Relvas
Liceu Franco-Brasileiro
Liceu Molière - Lyceé Molière
Military School of Rio de Janeiro
OLM Our Lady of Mercy School
Colégio pH
Sagrado Coração de Maria - Sacre Cóeur de Marie
Santa Mônica Centro Educacional (SMCE)
Santo Agostinho - Saint Augustin School
Santo Ignácio
São Vicente de Paulo
São Bento - Saint Benedict School
Sion
Teresiano

Rio de Janeiro
Rio de Janeiro schools
Rio de Janeiro